Imam Khomeini Naval University of Noshahr is the military academy of Islamic Republic of Iran Navy located in Noshahr, Mazandaran Province. Cadets of the academy achieve ensign rank upon graduation and join the Navy.

References 

Educational institutions established in 1980
Education in Mazandaran Province
1980 establishments in Iran
Naval academies
Islamic Republic of Iran Navy
Nowshahr County
Military education and training in Iran